Operation Nordlicht (German, 'Northern Light') was a German operation during the end of World War II. After Finland had made peace with the USSR, the Germans planned to fall back to defense lines built and equipped in advance across Finnish Lapland (Operation Birke). During the operation, the Oberkommando der Wehrmacht gave an order to move from Operation Birke to Operation Nordlicht on 4 October 1944. That meant that instead of evacuating everything and then fortifying on the strong defensive positions, the German 20th Mountain Army was to retreat according to a set timetable to a new defense line in Lyngen, Norway. The Germans retreated using scorched-earth tactics and destroyed almost all buildings and all boats in Finnmark, thus denying the enemy any facilities in the area. The same tactics had already been used in Finnish Lapland. The retreat ended on 20 January 1945. A detailed account of 'the Nazis' scorched earth campaign in Norway' by Vincent Hunt includes statements by eyewitnesses, photographs taken at the time and a map of locations and prisoner of war camps.

References

Leningrad
Leningrad
Conflicts in 1944
Battles and operations of the Eastern Front of World War II
Nordlicht
1944 in Finland